Edwin Frederick Schreiber (31 May 1936 – 7 October 2010) was a South African cricketer who played first-class cricket for Border from 1954 to 1967.

Edwin Schreiber, an off-spin bowler, was the mainstay of the Border spin attack from 1954–55, when he made his debut as an 18-year-old, until 1961–62. He bowled well for Border against the touring MCC in 1956-57 and Australians in 1957-58. In the 1957–58 season he was the second-most successful South African bowler (behind Hugh Tayfield), with 38 wickets at an average of 21.92.

He was widely expected to take Tayfield's place as South Africa's principal Test spinner when Tayfield retired after the 1957–58 series, but Tayfield returned after taking only the 1958–59 season off while Schreiber's form fell away from its peak.

Schreiber was a very economical bowler, conceding only 1.88 runs per over in his first-class career. In 1958–59 he took 11 for 103 off 72.4 overs in the match against North-Eastern Transvaal. His best innings figures were 8 for 67 against Eastern Province in 1957–58. He was a magnificent fielder, especially at cover. In a club match for Buffaloes against Queenstown he ran out four batsmen in one innings with direct hits.

References

External links

 Edwin Schreiber at CricketArchive

1936 births
2010 deaths
South African cricketers
Border cricketers
Cricketers from East London, Eastern Cape